James Victor Brown (5 June 1935 – 14 July 2020) was an Australian rugby union player who played for the Australian national team nine times.

Early life
Brown was born in Sydney and attended Newington College (1947–1951) from where he was selected to play rugby in the GPS 1st XV. Post school he became a member of Randwick pack as hooker joining Nick Shehadie.

Representative career
At the age of twenty, Brown was selected to represent New South Wales against Queensland. The following year he played in his first test match against South Africa. He retired from representative rugby after the 1957–58 Australia rugby union tour of Britain, Ireland and France. He was known for his fiery personality and was on one occasion sent off during training by the Australian coach, Denis Cowper, a fellow Old Newingtonian.

References

1935 births
2020 deaths
Australian rugby union players
Rugby union hookers
People educated at Newington College
Australia international rugby union players
Rugby union players from Sydney